Daniel Stensøe (born 10 September 1994) is a Norwegian footballer who plays as a midfielder for Spjelkavik IL.

He started his career in SK Herd and joined the Tippeligaen side Aalesund after the 2012 season. He made his debut for Aalesund as a substitute against Brann in May 2013. Ahead of the 2014 season he went back to Herd.

References

External links

1994 births
Living people
Sportspeople from Ålesund
Norwegian footballers
Aalesunds FK players
Spjelkavik IL players
Brattvåg IL players
Eliteserien players

Association football midfielders